The Order of Truxillo (or Trujillo) was a short-lived military brotherhood based at the castle of Truxillo in the kingdom of Castile.

The order's origins are obscure. It was incorporated into the Leonese Order of San Julián del Pereiro before 1188. Its master, between 1188 and 1193, was a certain Gómez, possibly the same person as the master of San Julián. In 1188, the order received Ronda as a possession but not under its lordship. In 1195, Truxillo was captured by the Almohads. The order soon ceased to exist, its possessions (including Ronda) being absorbed by the Castilian Order of Calatrava. Sometime between 1207 and 1221, Ronda came under the control of the Order of the Temple. The Order of San Julián, thus deprived of its foothold in Castile, was compensated for its loss of the Order of Truxillo and its possessions by King Ferdinand III, who united León and Castile in 1230.

Notes

Sources

Military units and formations of the Reconquista
Military orders (monastic society)
Order of Alcántara
12th-century establishments in Spain
1190s disestablishments